Robert Anthony Hatcher (February 24, 1819 – December 4, 1886) was a prominent Missouri politician and Democrat who served in the Confederate States Congress during the American Civil War. He then spent three terms in the United States House of Representatives after the war during Reconstruction.

Biography
Hatcher was born in Buckingham County, Virginia, and later moved to Kentucky, where he was admitted to the bar, before finally settling in Missouri in 1847. He was member of the Missouri House of Representatives in 1850 and 1851.

During the Civil War, he represented the state in the Second Confederate Congress in 1864 and 1865. After the war, he was elected to the United States Congress as a member of the Forty-third Congress, the Forty-fourth Congress, and the Forty-fifth Congress serving from 1873 to 1879. In the Forty-fifth Congress, he served as Chairman of the Committee on Public Expenditures.

External links
 Political Graveyard
 Retrieved on 2009-5-11

Members of the Confederate House of Representatives from Missouri
People from Buckingham County, Virginia
Kentucky lawyers
Missouri lawyers
1819 births
1886 deaths
Democratic Party members of the United States House of Representatives from Missouri
19th-century American politicians
People from Charleston, Missouri
19th-century American lawyers